is a Chinese footballer who plays as a goalkeeper.

Career statistics

Club
.

Notes

References

External links

2001 births
Living people
Chinese footballers
Association football goalkeepers
Komazawa University alumni
J3 League players
Gamba Osaka players
Gamba Osaka U-23 players